K. V. Guhan is an Indian cinematographer from Chennai, India.
 Guhan is the younger brother of the Tamil film director, Saran.  He collaborated with director Radha Mohan, for two notable films in Tamil cinema, Mozhi (2007) and Payanam (2011). He was also lauded for his work in Athadu (2005), Jalsa (2008), Dookudu (2011), Baadshah (2013), and Aagadu (2014). He made his directorial debut, in 2010, with Inidhu Inidhu, the remake of Happy Days (2007). It was produced by Prakash Raj, under Duet Movies. He has also directed the Telugu films, 118 (2019), WWW (2021), and Highway (2022). He worked as an assistant, under noted cinematographer, P. C. Sreeram. In 2011, his work on Dookudu, was nominated for the SIIMA Award for Best Cinematographer (Telugu), at the 1st SIIMA.

Filmography

References

External links
 

Cinematographers from Tamil Nadu
Telugu film cinematographers
Living people
Artists from Chennai
Tamil film cinematographers
Year of birth missing (living people)